|}

This is a list of House of Assembly results for the 1924 South Australian state election. Each district elected multiple members.

Every voter would receive a ballot paper where they would cast 2 or 3 votes for different candidates. In electorates that were not unopposed, the 2 or 3 candidates with the most votes would be elected.

Results by electoral district

Adelaide

Albert

Alexandra

Barossa

Burra Burra

East Torrens

Flinders

Murray

Newcastle

North Adelaide

Port Adelaide

Port Pirie

Stanley

Sturt

Victoria

Wallaroo

West Torrens

Wooroora

Yorke Peninsula

See also
 Candidates of the 1924 South Australian state election
 Members of the South Australian House of Assembly, 1924–1927

References

1924
1924 elections in Australia
1920s in South Australia